Nezamabad (also Romanized as Nez̧āmābād; also known as Nazīmābād and Nizvimabad) is a village in Zanjanrud-e Bala Rural District, in the Central District of Zanjan County, Zanjan Province, Iran. At the 2006 census, its population was 79, in 17 families.

References 

Populated places in Zanjan County